The Saint in London is a 1939 British crime film, the third of eight films in RKO's film series featuring the adventures of Simon Templar, alias "The Saint".

It stars George Sanders as Templar and was produced by William Sistrom. John Paddy Carstairs directed. Lynn Root and Frank Fenton wrote the screenplay based on Leslie Charteris' short story "The Million Pound Day", which was published in the 1932 collection The Holy Terror, published in the US as The Saint vs. Scotland Yard.

Plot
Returning to London, Simon Templar, alias "the Saint," meets and hires a reformed ex-con named Dugan while rendezvousing with Sir Richard Blake, a friend of his in British Intelligence, who recruits him to look into a (as it would turn out) suspected spy named Bruno Lang. At a party that weekend, he tails Lang to his home after meeting a beautiful, adventurous young woman named Penny Parker, who follows him after realizing who he is having been fascinated by his exploits. She helps him escape after he steals evidence against Lang from his safe.

As they flee back to London, they rescue a terrified and tortured French diplomat who had been abducted by Lang and his henchmen. Lang informs his co-conspirators of Templar's interference. Leaving Penny in Dugan's care, Templar takes the diplomat, Count Duni, to an inn and has him tended to. He reveals that his country sent him to supervise the printing of new currency and that he had been forced to authorize the secret printing of over a million pounds of it, which Lang and his partners mean to flee the country with.

Templar hands over the document he stole from Lang to Blake, meanwhile his home is visited by Kussella, another of Lang's subordinates, who Penny tails. Templar's actions have drawn the attention of his friendly rival from Scotland Yard, Inspector Teal, who he finds waiting for him when he returns home. After he leaves, Penny telephones and tells where she has tailed Kussella to, before he captures her and tells Templar to come to him alone. Rescuing her with Dugan's help, they return to the inn to find Duni murdered and Templar framed by an unknown party. Teal, however, is aware of the frame and lets Templar escape to help him pursue the true killers.

Updated by the inn-keeper that Duni had contacted a man named Stengler at his embassy shortly before he was murdered, Templar visits him while posing as Teal and tricks him into lying about Duni and unknowingly revealing his involvement with Lang, before having him trailed by Dugan, who later informs Templar and Penny that he has tailed Stengler to Lang's house and has them at gunpoint.

Before Templar and Penny can arrive, Kussella and Lang's remaining henchman arrive and knock Dugan out. When they arrive, Lang has Penny tied up and gives Templar an hour to return the evidence he stole in exchange for her and Dugan's safety. Templar disarms Lang with throwing knife and knocks him out, before rescuing Penny and Dugan. Kussella is fatally shot by mistake by one of his co-conspirators, and Templar, Dugan and Penny flee with the stolen money and Lang, leaving the latter's remaining subordinates to be caught by Teal, who has been trailing Templar.

Back at Scotland Yard, where Teal brings Stengler while pretending not to suspect him of wrongdoing, they find Templar and the others waiting in Teal's office with Blake. Teal has Lang and Stengler arrested for espionage and murder following Blake's explanation about enlisting Templar to help expose them, and Templar leaves to take Penny home before he ends up in love and married.

Cast
 George Sanders as Simon Templar / The Saint
 Sally Gray as Penny Parker
 David Burns as Dugan
 Gordon McLeod as Inspector Claud Teal
 Henry Oscar as Bruno Lang
 Athene Seyler as Mrs. Buckley
 John Abbott as Count Stephen Duni
 Ralph Truman as Kussella
 Charles Carson as Mr. Morgan
 Carl Jaffe as Stengler
 Norah Howard as Mrs. Morgan
 Ballard Berkeley as Sir Richard Blake
 Charles Paton as Tobacco Shop Proprietor

Reception
The film was shot in London. Sanders arrived there in March 1939.

Notes
The film made a profit of $140,000. According to Saint historian Burl Barer, Charteris considered The Saint in London to be the best of the RKO film series. He admired director Carstairs' work enough to dedicate the book The Saint in the Sun to him; Carstairs is also the only person to direct not only RKO Saint films, but also two episodes of the 1962–69 series The Saint.

References

 Burl Barer, The Saint: A Complete History in Print, Radio, Film and Television 1928–1992. Jefferson, N.C.: MacFarland, 2003 (originally published in 1992).

External links
 
 
 
 

1939 films
The Saint (Simon Templar)
American black-and-white films
Films directed by John Paddy Carstairs
RKO Pictures films
1939 crime films
Films set in London
American crime films
Films shot at Associated British Studios
1930s English-language films
1930s American films